Pinchas Steinberg (born 13 December 1945 ) is a conductor born in mandatory Palestine. He is currently the Chief Conductor of the Budapest Philharmonic Orchestra.

Early career
Steinberg studied violin in the USA under Jascha Heifetz and Joseph Gingold.  Pinchas studied composition under Boris Blacher in Berlin.

His conducting debut was in 1974 with the Radio Symphony Orchestra in Berlin, followed by invitations to conduct the Philharmonia Orchestra London, Royal Philharmonic and London Symphony Orchestra.

Guest Conducting
Steinberg was the Guest Conductor of the major European and American orchestras, including the Berlin Philharmonic, Czech Philharmonic, Orchestre de Paris, Orchestre National de France, Santa Cecilia Orchestra in Rome, Budapest Festival Orchestra, Israel Philharmonic, NHK Symphony Orchestra (Tokyo), Munich Philharmonic, Cleveland Orchestra, Boston Symphony Orchestra & Dallas Symphony Orchestra, Royal Stockholm Philharmonic, among many others.

Festival Appearances
Guest appearances have included the festivals of Salzburg, Munich, Berlin, Prague, Bratislava, Vienna, Verona, Grenada, Orange and the Richard Strauss Festival in Garmisch.

Opera
Steinberg’s Opera performances include the Vienna State Opera, Covent Garden London, San Francisco, Paris, Rome Turin, Naples, Madrid, Barcelona, Munich, Berlin and Hamburg. His La Scala debut was in 2010, leading the Orchestra Filarmonica della Scala in 3 concerts of Robert Schumann’s Scenes from Goethe’s Faust.

Notable Achievements
1988 to 1993, Permanent Guest Conductor at the Vienna State Opera

1989 to 1996, Chief conductor Radio Symphony Orchestra in Vienna

2002-2005 Music director of the Orchestre de la Suisse Romande in Geneva.

2014–present, Chief conductor of the Budapest Philharmonic Orchestra

Acclaimed Recordings & Repertoire
Alfredo Catalani: La Wally (1990) 

Jules Massenet: Chérubin (1992) (awarded the Grand Prix du Disque, the Diapason d'Or, the German Critics Prize and the Caecilia Prize Bruxelles) 

Wagner: Der fliegende Holländer (1993) 

Strauss: Die Schweigsame Frau (2002) 

Mozart: La Clemenza Di Tito (2006)

References

External links
Pinchas Steinberg Official website
 Pinchas Steinberg at Boris Orlob Management
BBC Performances
Upcoming Performances

20th-century conductors (music)
21st-century conductors (music)
Israeli conductors (music)
Jewish classical musicians
1945 births
Living people